Charles Champaud, also spelled Sharl Shampov, was a Swiss gymnast.  He represented Bulgaria at the First 1896 Summer Olympics in Athens. Champaud competed in the parallel bars, vault, and pommel horse events. Although the rest of his placings in each competition are unknown, he occupies the prestigious fifth place on vault and earned the first two points for Bulgaria.

Champaud was a Swiss national working as a gymnastics teacher at a Sofia high school when he represented Bulgaria at the first modern Olympics. Bulgaria is thus often included in the figure of participating nations.

In Bulgaria, Charles Champaud also played an important role in introducing football to the country and was the person to bring the sport to the capital city of Sofia in 1895 (the first football game in Bulgaria being in Varna in 1894, organized by another Swiss teacher, Georges de Regibus).

References

External links

Swiss male artistic gymnasts
Gymnasts at the 1896 Summer Olympics
19th-century sportsmen
Olympic gymnasts of Bulgaria
Bulgarian male artistic gymnasts
Year of death missing
Swiss expatriates in Bulgaria
1865 births
Date of birth missing
Place of birth missing
Place of death missing